The Apopcalyptic Manifesto is a compilation album by Norwegian futurepop group Apoptygma Berzerk. The album is mostly a compilation of tracks from Soli Deo Gloria and with other early single tracks added. A lot of tracks are exclusive to this release, such as the original version of "Arp", "APB Goes C-64" and "Lidelsens Mening". Also, the "Crisp version" of "Burnin' Heretic" included on the limited edition of this release hadn't been released since it appeared on the "Sex, Drugs & EBM" sampler in 1992. This was also the first time the original vinyl version of "Ashes to Ashes" was released on a CD along with its b-side "Wrack 'Em to Pieces". The album reached #18 on the CMJ RPM charts in the U.S.

Track listing

References

1996 albums
Apoptygma Berzerk albums